Charlie Cheever (born August 2, 1981) is the co-founder of Quora along with Adam D'Angelo, an online knowledge market. He was formerly an engineer and manager at Facebook. Prior to Facebook, Cheever was employed by Amazon.com in Seattle. He left Facebook to start Quora in June 2009. He stepped down from active management of Quora in September 2012 but remains an advisor. In 2016, it was announced that he is working as the CEO of Expo (formerly known as Exponent), a startup company that is an open-source platform for making universal native apps for Android, iOS, and the web with JavaScript and React.

Cheever is from Pittsburgh, Pennsylvania, and is a graduate of Harvard College with a B.A. in Computer Science. He is a member of the Fly Club.

Education 

Cheever attended Shady Side Academy for high school. He attended Harvard University from 1999 to 2003 where he graduated with a B.A. in Computer Science.

Harvard 

In 2000 Cheever was brought in front of Harvard’s Administrative Board for creating a database of the Harvard student body. The program enabled students to find which dorm their fellow classmates were living in. The database was quickly shut down by the Harvard administration. A few years later Cheever's project partially inspired fellow Harvard alum Mark Zuckerberg to create the website FaceMash. Zuckerberg later said that he considered Cheever to be a “kindred spirit”.

Facebook 

Zuckerberg recruited Cheever away from Amazon to be an early engineer at Facebook. This hire, along with three others, was part of an initiative to shift the focus at Facebook.

Cheever and Adam D’Angelo were responsible for most of the critical programming work involved with turning Facebook from a website into a platform. Most notably Cheever worked on Facebook Connect Authentication, the gaming platform at Facebook, and Facebook Video.

Cheever became known as a top engineer at Facebook after creating one of the most important internal tools, bunnylol. The Python tool is still used today by every engineer at Facebook.

Expo.dev 
Charlie Cheever started working on Expo.dev in the summer of 2015. The mission was to open up mobile software development to kids.  Expo makes it easier to develop apps using React Native for major platforms including Web, iOS and Android.  Expo is used by large companies like Airbnb, Walmart, and Tesla.

References

External links

 https://expo.dev/

Living people
1981 births
American computer businesspeople
Engineers from Pennsylvania
Amazon (company) people
Businesspeople in information technology
Harvard College alumni
Facebook employees
Businesspeople from Pittsburgh
21st-century American businesspeople
American technology chief executives